Simon was a 13th-century prelate based in Moray, Scotland. Professor Donald Watt has shown (Fasti, 219), through the extrapolation of indirect evidence, that his surname was almost certainly "de Gunby".

He occurs as Dean of Moray in 1230. Simon held this position until, after the death of Andreas de Moravia, he was elected as the new Bishop of Moray. A Papal mandate of 3 March 1244, from Pope Innocent IV authorized the Bishop of Caithness (Gilbert de Moravia) and one Martin, clerk of the papal Camera Apostolica, to inquire about the legality of the election and if appropriate confirm and consecrate Simon. This process was apparently successful for Simon, as he held the episcopate until his death in 1251.

References
 Dowden, John, The Bishops of Scotland, ed. J. Maitland Thomson, (Glasgow, 1912)
 Keith, Robert, An Historical Catalogue of the Scottish Bishops: Down to the Year 1688, (London, 1924)
 Watt, D.E.R., Fasti Ecclesiae Scotinanae Medii Aevi ad annum 1638, 2nd Draft, (St Andrews, 1969)

1251 deaths
Bishops of Moray
13th-century Scottish Roman Catholic bishops
People from Lincolnshire
Apostolic Camera
Year of birth unknown
Deans of Moray, Ross and Caithness